Walloping Kid is a 1926 American silent Western film directed by Robert J. Horner and starring William Barrymore, Jack Richardson and Frank Whitson.

Cast
 William Barrymore as The Walloping Kid
 Jack Richardson as Don Dawson
 Dorothy Ward as Sally Carter
 Frank Whitson as Sally's father
 Al Kaufman as Wild Cat McKee
 Jack Herrick as Battling Lewis
 Pauline Curley

References

Bibliography
 Langman, Larry. A Guide to Silent Westerns. Greenwood Publishing Group, 1992.

External links
 

1926 films
1926 Western (genre) films
American black-and-white films
Films directed by Robert J. Horner
Silent American Western (genre) films
1920s English-language films
1920s American films